The Crimes Act of 1790 (or the Federal Criminal Code of 1790), formally titled An Act for the Punishment of Certain Crimes Against the United States, defined some of the first federal crimes in the United States and expanded on the criminal procedure provisions of the Judiciary Act of 1789. The Crimes Act was a "comprehensive statute defining an impressive variety of federal crimes".

As an enactment of the First Congress, the Crimes Act is often regarded as a quasi-constitutional text. The punishment of treason, piracy, counterfeiting, as well as crimes committed on the high seas or against the law of nations, followed from relatively explicit constitutional authority. The creation of crimes within areas under exclusive federal jurisdiction followed from the plenary power of Congress over the "Seat of the Government", federal enclaves, and federal territories. The creation of crimes involving the integrity of the judicial process derived from Congress's authority to establish such courts.

The Crimes Act also established a statute of limitations for federal crimes, provided for criminal venue, ensured procedural protections for treason and capital defendants, simplified the pleading requirements for perjury, and provided protections broader than those in the Constitution against corruption of blood. Further, the act provided for punitive dissection of murderers and codified diplomatic immunity.

Background
Even after the passage of the Judiciary Act of 1789, "the definition of crimes and the establishment of punishments" remained a "missing link of the criminal system". The Judiciary Act of 1789 divided original jurisdiction for the trial of federal crimes between the district courts and the circuit courts. The district courts were given jurisdiction over all federal crimes "where no other punishment than whipping, not exceeding thirty stripes, a fine not exceeding one hundred dollars, or a term of imprisonment not exceeding six months, is to be inflicted". The circuit courts were given concurrent jurisdiction over these crimes, and exclusive jurisdiction over all other federal crimes. The circuit courts also exercised appellate jurisdiction over the district courts, but only in civil cases.

The Judiciary Act of 1789 also placed the responsibility for prosecuting federal crimes in the United States Attorney for each federal judicial district. The Act provided that "there shall be appointed in each district" a "person learned in the law to act as attorney for the United States in such district, who shall be sworn or affirmed to the faithful execution of his office, whose duty it shall be to prosecute in such district all delinquents for crimes and offences, cognizable under the authority of the United States."

Prior to the Crimes Act, Congress had established very few federal crimes. Among Congress's earlier criminal statutes were:
The renewal of the Northwest Ordinance, which authorized the executive to adopt state law within the Northwest Territory; and
A prohibition on unloading ships in the dark or without a license, as well as customs bribery and false statements; and
A prohibition on census takers failing to report their findings.

Drafting
The Senate passed an act to define a variety of federal crimes on August 31, 1789, but the House did not act on that bill.

Like the Judiciary Act of 1789 and the Process Act of 1789, the Crimes Act was primarily authored by Senator (and future Chief Justice) Oliver Ellsworth as the chair of the Senate committee. The committee examined the state criminal laws of Massachusetts, New Jersey, Pennsylvania, Virginia, and South Carolina at the beginning of the drafting process. The Crimes Act generated "little reported debate" on the floor of Congress. The act was passed on April 30, 1790.

Crimes established
Due to the seriousness of the authorized sentences, under the Judiciary Act of 1789, original jurisdiction for the trial of all of the crimes created by the Crimes Act would have rested with the circuit courts; none of the crimes created could have been tried in the district courts.

Treason
Article Three provides that: "Treason against the United States, shall consist only in levying War against them, or in adhering to their Enemies, giving them Aid and Comfort. No Person shall be convicted of Treason unless on the Testimony of two Witnesses to the same overt Act, or on Confession in open Court. The Congress shall have power to declare the Punishment of Treason, but no Attainder of Treason shall work Corruption of Blood, or Forfeiture except during the Life of the Person attainted."

As to misprision of treason, according to David P. Currie, because "[t]he Constitution said nothing of this offense", "the legislators must have interpreted the narrow definition of treason in Article III not to preclude it from creating lesser related offenses that might otherwise fall within federal purview—although nothing in the misprision provision suggested that Congress had yet considered the possible impact of the Treason Clause on its efforts to punish seditious expression."

Piracy and the high seas
Article One provides that Congress shall have the power "[t]o define and punish Piracies and Felonies committed on the high Seas". Five sections in the Crimes Act "were devoted to the subject". Currie notes that the various piracy offenses "take an exceedingly broad view of what constituted piracy", but that "[f]rom a constitutional standpoint no harm was done, since all of the acts punished were felonious and Congress's power extended to all felonies on the high seas."

"The principal provisions with respect to piracy were incorporated in section 8." Section 8 applied not only to the "high Seas", but also to "any river, haven, basin, or bay, out of the jurisdiction of any particular State". Currie notes a variety of constitutional theories which Congress might have espoused in order to justify this provision: "Whether Congress thought authority over such places included within the ostensibly narrower term 'high Seas', necessary and proper to the regulation of commerce or to the exercise of admiralty jurisdiction, or implicit in a central government responsible for external affairs is not clear."

Currie also argues that the phrase "offence, which, if committed within the body of a county, would, by laws of the United States, be punishable with death" is vague. He suggests that it could refer to any federal law, to any state or federal law, or only to federal laws applicable to places under exclusive federal jurisdiction.

Counterfeiting
Article One provides that Congress shall have the power "[t]o provide for the Punishment of counterfeiting the Securities and current Coin of the United States." Currie argues that section 14's somewhat broad reading of the word "Securities" is fair enough. Currie suggests that "[n]othing was said of counterfeiting coins" because the United States Mint had not yet been established.

Some members of the House, including Theodore Sedgwick of Massachusetts, spoke against the prescribing death penalty for counterfeiting, viewing it as too harsh.

Crimes against the law of nations
Article One provides that Congress shall have the power "[t]o define and punish ... Offenses against the Law of Nations." According to Currie: "No reliance on inherent on implied powers over foreign affairs was necessary to justify" sections 26 and 28 as each "plausibly described" offenses against the law of nations. Congress had also created a civil offense against the law of nations in the Alien Tort Statute of the Judiciary Act of 1789.

Exclusive federal jurisdiction
Several offenses were limited to acts committed in places "under the sole and exclusive jurisdiction of the United States". Such regulations would have applied in the "Seat of the Government", federal enclaves, and federal territories.

Article One provides that Congress shall have the power "[t]o exercise exclusive Legislation in all Cases whatsoever, over such District (not exceeding ten Miles square) as may, by Cession of particular States, and the acceptance of Congress, become the Seat of the Government of the United States, and to exercise like Authority over all Places purchased by the Consent of the Legislature of the State in which the Same shall be, for the Erection of Forts, Magazines, Arsenals, dock-Yards, and other needful Buildings." And Article Four provides that "Congress shall have Power to dispose of and make all needful Rules and Regulations respecting the Territory ..."

With reference to the "arms, ordnance, munition, shot, powder, or habiliments of war belonging to the United States" provision of section 16, Currie argues that it could have been justified under Congress's Article One power to "raise and support armies" or Congress's Article Four power to make needful rules respecting "property belonging to the United States".

In United States v. Bevans (1818), although the defendant had only been charged under § 8 of the Crimes Act, Chief Justice Marshall proceeded to consider whether the offense would have been cognizable under § 3. Following the canon of noscitur a sociis, Marshall interpreted the jurisdictional phrase "any fort, arsenal, dockyard, magazine, or in any other place, or district of country" to be limited to places that are "fixed and territorial" (i.e. not to include a navy vessel).

Crimes against persons

Integrity of the judicial process
The constitutional authorization of these crimes was less explicit, but Article One does provide that Congress shall have the power "[t]o constitute Tribunals inferior to the supreme Court." According to Currie:

According to Stacy and Dayton, these provision are "compelling evidence that the founders did not intend the national role in criminal law to be limited to crimes expressly mentioned in the Constitution".

Criminal procedure

Statute of limitations
Section 32 provided for the following statutes of limitations: no statute of limitations for wilful murder or forgery; no statute of limitations for fugitives from justice; three (3) years for capital offenses (other than wilful murder and forgery); two (2) years for non-capital offenses. In United States v. Cook (1872), the Court held that indictments need not plead facts establishing that these limitations periods have not run.

Venue
Section 8 provided that "the trial of crimes committed on the high seas, or in any place out of the jurisdiction of any particular State, shall be in the district where the offender is apprehended, or into which he may first be brought". Thus, section 8 was an exercise of Congress's authority under Article Three to define criminal venue for all crimes "not committed within any State". But, the Supreme Court did not interpret section 8 as exercising the full extent of Congress's authority under Article Three. In Ex parte Bollman (1807), the Court held that the statutory term "any place out of the jurisdiction of any particular state" applied only to "any river, haven, bason or bay, not within the jurisdiction of any particular state", and only in "those cases there is no court which has particular cognizance of the crime".

Treason and capital cases

The Crimes Act prescribed death as the exclusive punishment for the crimes of treason, counterfeiting, wilful murder, and aiding the escape of a death row prisoner, as well as piracy, murder, and robbery on the high seas. Section 29 provided treason and capital defendants a right to a copy of the indictment, a list of the jury (and, in treason cases, witnesses), appointed counsel, and compulsory process:

Most of the provisions of section 29 are plainly similar to those of the Sixth Amendment, namely the Information Clause, the Assistance of Counsel Clause, and the Compulsory Process Clause. The Sixth Amendment (and the remainder of the Bill of Rights) had not yet been ratified at the time of the Crimes Act's passage.

Section 30 provided treason and capital defendants with peremptory challenges and provided for a plea of not guilty in the case that the defendant refused to enter a plea:

In United States v. Shackleford (1855), the Court held that the section 30's allocation of peremptory challenges controlled, rather than an 1840 statute that required federal jury selection to generally follow state law (and, thus, the prosecutor was given no peremptory challenges in such cases). Ten years later, Congress abrogated Shackleford, granting prosecutors five peremptory challenges in treason and capital cases (and two in non-capital felony cases); the 1865 act left the defendant's number of peremptory challenges unchanged.

Section 31 eliminated the benefit of clergy for capital crimes. Section 33 designated the means of execution as "hanging ... by the neck until dead".

Perjury indictments

Section 19, applicable to perjury prosecutions under section 18, provided that

and section 20 provided that

Sentencing
Section 24 provided that "no conviction or judgment of any of the offences aforesaid, shall work corruption of blood, or any forfeiture of estate". This generalized the guarantee of Article Three that "no Attainder of Treason shall work Corruption of Blood, or Forfeiture except during the Life of the Person attainted".

The Crimes Act made no provision for the creation of federal prisons. Instead, a September 21, 1789 concurrent resolution asked the state legislatures to authorize their prisons to imprison federal prisoners. The first federal prison was not opened until 1894 at Fort Leavenworth.

Other provisions

Dissection

Section 4 authorized a court to order the post-execution dissection of the corpse of convicted murderers. According to David P. Currie, this was the "most controversial provision of the entire statute". Dissection as punishment had its roots in a 1789 New York statute and a 1752 English law. Rep. Michael J. Stone of Maryland argued against the inclusion of this provision as cruel. Currie argues that Congress was on a firm constitutional footing in enacting this provision in relation to murders committed in areas under exclusive federal jurisdiction, but perhaps less so for murders committed on the high seas.

Diplomatic immunity

Section 25 provided:

Section 27 provided a limited exception for private debts contracted by ambassadors prior to the passage of the act.

Prosecutions

Between 1790 and 1797, only 147 criminal cases were brought in the circuit courts, and more than half of those cases were brought in the Pennsylvania circuit court concerning the Whiskey Rebellion.  And, between 1790 and 1801, only 426 criminal cases were brought in all federal courts (the district courts and the circuit courts combined).

Amendments and repeals
Section 1 was supplemented by an omnibus treason law during the Civil War, which, inter alia, provided for punishments other than death and additional lesser offenses. The offense of treason, and the punishment thereof, were codified in consecutive sections of the Revised Statutes. Both were repealed and replaced by the Criminal Code of 1909. During the 1948 re-codification of the Criminal Code, the treason offense was amended and moved to 18 U.S.C. § 2381, where it remains. It was amended in 1994.

Section 2 was codified in the Revised Statutes, and re-codified by the Criminal Code of 1909, and the 1948 re-codification. It was amended in 1994.

Section 3 was amended by § 4 of the Crimes Act of 1825 and codified in the Revised Statutes.

Sections 4, 5 and 6 were codified in the Revised Statutes.

Section 7 was amended in 1857 and 1875 and codified in the Revised Statutes.

Section 8 was amended in 1820, 1835, and 1846 and codified in five sections of the Revised Statutes. Further, § 8 was supplemented by additional prohibitions in § 5 of an 1819 act and § 3 of an 1820 act. Despite the similarity of the provisions, all three were all separately codified in the Revised Statutes in 1874. Section 8 was repealed by the Criminal Code of 1909. Section 8's venue provision was re-enacted by § 14 of the Crimes Act of 1825, with minor changes.

Sections 9 and 10 were codified in the Revised Statutes. Section 11 was codified in two sections.

Section 12 was amended in 1835 and codified in two sections of the Revised Statutes.

Section 13 was codified in the Revised Statutes.

Section 14 was repealed by § 17 of the Crimes Act of 1825, which broadened the offense of counterfeiting and reduced authorized the punishment from death to 10 years hard labor and a $5000 fine. Sections 18 through 21 of the 1825 Act created additional counterfeiting offenses.

Section 15 was amended in 1874 and codified in the Revised Statutes.

Section 16 was amended in 1842 and codified in the Revised Statutes.

Section 17 was amended by § 8 of the Crimes Act of 1825 and codified in the Revised Statutes.

Section 18 was amended by § 13 of the Crimes Act of 1825—which defined the term "perjury" and increased the authorized punishment to 5 years hard labor and a $3000 fine—and further amended in 1874 and 1876. Perjury and subornation were separately codified in the Revised Statutes.

Section 19 was codified in three sections of the Revised Statutes, and Section 21 was codified in two.

Section 22 was amended in 1866 and codified in the Revised Statutes.

Sections 23 and 24 were codified in the Revised Statutes.

Sections 25 through 29 were not codified in Title LXX of the Revised Statutes.

Section 30, with regard to peremptory challenges, was re-enacted and supplemented in 1865. Section 30, with regard to a defendant's failure to enter a plea, was extended from capital to all crimes by § 14 of the Crimes Act of 1825.

Section 31 and 33 were codified in the Revised Statutes.

Constitutionality
According to Taylor: "Like the Judiciary Act of 1789, the Process Act of 1789, and the Crimes Act of 1790, having been passed by the First Congress, are perhaps the statutes most informative of an original understanding of Congress's constitutional power over the federal judiciary."

According to Kurland, "for the most part, Congress enacted statutes that closely tracked the specific constitutional grants of federal criminal authority. However, Congress continued to venture slightly, but significantly, into areas outside the specific constitutional grants." As examples in the later category, Kurland cites the provisions concerning the integrity of the federal criminal process, bribery, misprison of treason, and the revenue provisions.

Currie notes that the Crimes Act "resolved a number of interesting constitutional questions". For example, with reference to the punishments of "stripes" and disqualification from office, Currie argues that: "These provisions suggest not only that Congress viewed neither of these punishments as cruel and unusual, but also that they did not understand impeachment to be the sole avenue for the future disqualification of current officeholders." Taylor goes further in arguing the disqualification provision was not merely prospective: "The Crimes Act of 1790 indicates that, beyond its plenary power over federal court jurisdiction and procedure, the First Congress believed it had the constitutional power to make conviction by a court an alternative means of removing a federal judge, outside the impeachment context, and it sheds light on the First Congress's understanding of its own powers to discipline federal judges."

Similarly, the Supreme Court and individual justices have cited the Crimes Act's authorization of the death penalty as evidence that the founders believed it was constitutional.

Notes

References
David P. Currie, Constitution in Congress: Substantive Issues in the First Congress, 1789–1791, 61  775 (1994).
Edwin D. Dickinson, Is the Crime of Piracy Obsolete?, 38  334 (1924).
 (1985).
Adam H. Kurland, First Principles of American Federalism and the Nature of Federal Criminal Jurisdiction, 45  1 (1996).
Paul Taylor, Congress's Power to Regulate the Federal Judiciary: What the First Congress and the First Federal Courts Can Teach Today's Congress and Courts, 37  847 (2010).

External links

Text from the Library of Congress

United States federal criminal legislation
Legal history of the United States
Acts of the 1st United States Congress
United States federal public corruption crime
United States piracy law
1790 in American law